The Productions of Time is a science fiction novel by English writer John Brunner, first published in The Magazine of Fantasy and Science Fiction in 1966. It appeared in book form the following year, published by Signet Books.

Plot summary

The plot follows actor Murray Douglas as he joins a theatre production with a group of other actors. Each of the cast members has had career problems because of drugs, alcohol, or other kinks. The play is an avant-garde one, a form of improv where the actors make up the script during rehearsal, and rehearsals take place in an isolated country house. It emerges that the alleged playwright is feeding each participant's vices, using a futuristic form of sleep learning to overcome their attempts to stay "clean". This is being done to benefit the prurient interests of decadent time travellers.

References

Sources
Brunner, John (1970), The Productions of Time. Penguin Books (UK edition)'

1966 British novels
1966 science fiction novels
British science fiction novels
Novels by John Brunner
Novels about actors
Novels about time travel
Novels first published in serial form
Works originally published in The Magazine of Fantasy & Science Fiction
Signet Books books